The 2016 Belarusian Super Cup was held on 13 March 2016 between the 2015 Belarusian Premier League champions BATE Borisov and the 2014–15 Belarusian Cup runners-up Shakhtyor Soligorsk. BATE won the match 2–1 and won the trophy for the sixth time.

Match details

See also
2015 Belarusian Premier League
2014–15 Belarusian Cup

References

Belarusian Super Cup
Super
Belarusian Super Cup 2016
FC Shakhtyor Soligorsk matches
Belarusian Super Cup